Verne Rheem Mason (August 8, 1889 – November 16, 1965) was an eminent American internist and associate of Howard Hughes. Mason was chairman of the Howard Hughes Medical Institute's  medical advisory committee.

Early years
Born at Wapello, Iowa, in 1889, Mason received a B.S. from University of California, Berkeley, in 1911, and an M.D. from Johns Hopkins University in 1915. As a medical resident at Hopkins in 1922 Mason gave the disease sickle cell anemia its name.

Internist
When motion picture director Frank Capra fell ill with a mysterious fever after completing It Happened One Night, Columbia Pictures chief Harry Cohn called in Mason to diagnose and treat Capra's illness. In 1938, Mason was one of the physicians called to the sickbed of General of the Armies John J. Pershing. The commander of the American Expeditionary Force in France in World War I was in a coma and sinking. Mason made the medical report on General Pershing, who recovered and lived for 10 years more. When Howard Hughes lay near death in Los Angeles in 1946, following the crash of his experimental plane, the XF-11, he summoned Mason and asked, "Am I going to live?" "I don't know," Mason replied. "Then give this message to the Army," Hughes said. "The accident was caused by the rear half of the right propeller, which suddenly switched into reverse pitch position."

Verne Mason became Hughes personal physician.

Final years
Mason was for many years a member of the medical faculty of the University of Southern California, a professor of clinical medicine, and an attending physician at Cedars of Lebanon Hospital. He was considered a leading internist and diagnostician. Highly decorated, he served in both World Wars. Mason was chairman of the Howard Hughes Medical Institute's  medical advisory committee.  He later divorced his first wife Lucy M. Ginn and married Ruth Menardi, former wife of American composer Hoagy Carmichael.  Mason died on November 16, 1965, in Miami, Florida.

References

1889 births
1965 deaths
People from Wapello, Iowa
Johns Hopkins School of Medicine alumni
University of California, Berkeley alumni
Physicians of the Cedars-Sinai Medical Center